The Skyrunning European Championships are biennial (annual only the first three editions) skyrunning competitions, held for the first time in 2009 and organised by International Skyrunning Federation.

Editions

Medals

Men's SkyRace

Women's SkyRace

Men's Vertical Kilometer

Women's Vertical Kilometer

Men's Ultra SkyMarathon

Women's Ultra SkyMarathon

References

External links
 International Skyrunning Federation official web site

 
European
European championships
Recurring sporting events established in 2007